Fredrikstad (previously Frederiksstad; literally "Fredrik's Town") is a city and municipality in Viken county, Norway. The administrative centre of the municipality is the city of Fredrikstad.

The city of Fredrikstad was founded in 1567 by King Frederick II, and established as a municipality on 1 January 1838 (see formannskapsdistrikt). The rural municipality of Glemmen was merged with Fredrikstad on 1 January 1964. The rural municipalities of Borge, Onsøy, Kråkerøy, and Rolvsøy were merged with Fredrikstad on 1 January 1994.

Along with neighboring Sarpsborg, Fredrikstad forms the fifth largest city in Norway: Fredrikstad/Sarpsborg. As of 30 September 2021, according to Statistics Norway, these two municipalities have a total population of 141,708 with 83,761 in Fredrikstad and 57,947 in Sarpsborg.

Fredrikstad was built at the mouth of Glomma as a replacement after Sarpsborg ( upstream) was burnt down by the Swedish Army in the 1500s. Some of the citizens stayed behind and rebuilt their old town at its original site and got their city status back in 1839.

The city centre is on the west bank of the Glomma, while the old town on the east bank is Northern Europe's best preserved fortified town.

Fredrikstad used to have a large sawmill industry and was an important harbour for timber export, then later on shipbuilding, until the main yard was closed in 1988. The main industries are currently various chemical plants and other light industry.

In 2005, Fredrikstad was the final host port for the Tall Ships' Race, attracting thousands to the city. In 2019, it was the first host port.

In 2017, Fredrikstad won the national award for most attractive city. The award is given yearly by the Norwegian government on the basis of social, economic and environmental factors.

General information

Name
The city was named after the Danish king Frederick II in 1569. The last element stad means "city".

Prior to 1877, the name was spelled Frederiksstad, then from 1877 to 1888 it was written as Fredriksstad, and finally since 1889 it has been spelled in its current form: Fredrikstad.

Coat-of-arms
The coat-of-arms is from modern times. They were granted on 21 April 1967. The old arms are based on the oldest known seal of the city, which dates from 1610. They showed a fortress being guarded by a bear. Strangely, Fredrikstad had no fortifications in 1610 (it received some at the end of the 17th century). Fredrikstad was founded by citizens of Sarpsborg and both the fortress and the bear are taken from the old arms of Sarpsborg. The composition of the seal was also used as arms since the beginning of the 19th century. The new arms were granted at the 400th anniversary of the city in 1967 and show a more modern variation on the fortress and bear.

History
This new site's proximity to the sea and the accessible open land surrounding it made it a better location than the old one. The name Fredrikstad was first used in a letter from the King dated 6 February 1569. The temporary fortification built during the Hannibal War (1644–1645) between Sweden and Denmark-Norway, became permanent in the 1660s.

The work on the fortifications was first led by Willem Coucheron and later Johan Caspar von Cicignon. During the next 60 years, several fortifications at the Fredrikstad Fortress were built, including Isegran, Kongsten, and Cicignon. In 1735, a suburb on the western side of Glomma, Vestsiden, was founded. This part later grew faster than
the old city, and became the dominant city centre. Most of the buildings in the old city burned down during a fire in 1764.

In the 1840s, timber exporting from Fredrikstad started to gain momentum. In the 1860s, several steam powered saws were built along the river, and in 1879 the railway reached Fredrikstad, leading to further growth. With the decline of the timber exports as a result of the modernization of wood-processing industries in the early 1900s, Fredrikstad's production changed to other types of products. It later became one of Norway's most important industrial centres, famous for its large shipyard, Fredrikstad Mekaniske Verksted.

Education 
Fredrikstad has three high schools. Frederik II secondary school offering general studies and financial / administrative studies. Frederik II high school is a merger of former Frydenberg gymnastic and Christianslund Handelsgymnasium. Glemmen high school offers professional training and study. Wang Toppidrett Fredrikstad offers sports, science, languages, social sciences and economics. In addition, one finds Steiner, which is a private educational alternative to primary school higher step.

Østfold University College offers higher education (master's and bachelor's studies) at the Academy of Performing Arts, Faculty of Health and Social Care and the Faculty of Engineering at Kråkerøy. Here we also find Østfold College, which offers short professional courses built on a craft / journeyman, authorization or at least five years' experience in technical sciences and health / social science.

Also the Department of Journalism has its seat in Fredrikstad. The department offers primarily continuing education of journalists and editors.

Fredrikstad Museum
Fredrikstad Museum is located in Old Fredrikstad. The museum shows the history of the city and the surrounding region. The museum also manages Elingaard Manor in Onsøy and Torgauten Fort. Fredrikstad Museum was founded in 1903. Since 2003, the museum's management has been located in Tøihuset in Old Town.

Sport
Fredrikstad is home to nine-time Norway football winners Fredrikstad FK who play at the Fredrikstad Stadion. Egil Olsen, manager for the Norwegian national football team, is from Fredrikstad. There is also an American football team, the Fredrikstad Eagles.

Fredrikstad has a top-division handball team, Fredrikstad BK, and a top-division ice hockey team, Stjernen Hockey.

The city also has a number of floorball teams, including Slevik IBK, Fredrikstad IBK and St. Croix Pirates.

Notable residents

Public service 

 Albert Andriessen Bradt (ca.1607 in Fredrikstad – 1686) a Norwegian settler in New Netherland
 Henrik Bjelke (1615 on Onsøy – 1683) a Norwegian-Danish Admiral of the Realm 1662 to 1679
 Jørgen Bjelke (1621 on Onsøy – 1696) an officer and nobleman from Elingaard Manor 
 Johan Caspar von Cicignon (ca.1625-1696) general and engineer, lived in Fredrikstad
 Hans Jacob Stabel (1769 in Onsøy – 1836) priest and rep. at Norwegian Constituent Assembly
 Hans Nielsen Hauge (1771 in Rolvsøy – 1824) revivalist preacher for the Hauge Synod
 Johannes Wilhelm Christian Dietrichson (1815 in Fredrikstad – 1883) a Lutheran Minister
 Ole Jacob Broch (1818 in Fredrikstad – 1889) physicist, economist and Govt. minister
 Ole Peter Petersen (1822 in Fredrikstad – 1901) founder of Methodism in Norway and co-founder of Norwegian and Danish Methodism in the United States
 Katti Anker Møller (1868–1945) feminist and advocate for reproductive rights
 Hieronymus Heyerdahl (1867 in Fredrikstad – 1959) lawyer and Mayor of Oslo, 1911 to 1914
 Waldemar Ager (1869 in Fredrikstad – 1941) newspaperman in Eau Claire, Wisconsin
 Johan Oscar Smith (1871 in Fredrikstad – 1943) founder of the Brunstad Christian Church
 Roald Amundsen (1872 in Borge – 1928) a Norwegian explorer of polar regions
 Charles Anderson (1875 in Fredrikstad – 1949) Mayor of Murray, Utah 1920–1923
 Nils F. Ambursen (1876 in Fredrikstad – 1953) civil engineer and inventor, designed dams
 Peder Kolstad (1878 in Borge – 1932) Prime Minister of Norway, 1931 to 1932
 Johannes Brun (1891 in Fredrikstad – 1977) military officer and bridge champion
 Tove Mohr (1891 in Thorsø – 1981) a physician, socialist and proponent for women's rights
 Jens Gram Jr. (1897 in Fredrikstad – 1982) barrister and politician
 Ragnvald Marensius Gundersen (1907 in Glemmen – 1985) Mayor of Fredrikstad 1945–1965
 Rolf Jørgen Fuglesang (1909 in Fredrikstad – 1988) Govt. minister in WWII for Vidkun Quisling
 Bernt Karsten Øksendal (born 1945 in Fredrikstad) a Norwegian mathematician
 Svein Aaser (born 1946 in Fredrikstad) former CEO of DnB NOR, the large financial group
 Tore Eriksen (born 1947 in Fredrikstad) economist, diplomat and civil servant; "Norway's most powerful bureaucrat"
 Louise Kathrine Dedichen (born 1964 in Fredrikstad) Vice-admiral, rep. on the NATO Military Committee

Arts 

 Eyvind Alnæs (1872 in Fredrikstad – 1932) composer, pianist, organist and choir director
 Harald Heide (1876 in Fredrikstad – 1956) violinist, conductor and composer
 Hans Jacob Nilsen (1897 in Fredrikstad – 1957) actor, theatre director and film director
 Tore Segelcke (1901 in Fredrikstad – 1979) actress
 Georg Løkkeberg (1909 in Fredrikstad – 1986) actor and theatre director
 Herman Hebler (1911-2007) a printmaker and graphic artist, lived in Fredrikstad
 Karsten Andersen (1920 in Fredrikstad – 1997) conductor
 Arne Dørumsgaard (1921 in Fredrikstad – 2006) composer, poet and music collector
 Bjørn Johansen (1940 in Fredrikstad – 2002) an influential Norwegian jazz musician
 Gerd Brantenberg (born 1941) author, teacher and feminist writer, grew up in Fredrikstad
 Jon Mostad (born 1942 in Fredrikstad) composer

 Terje Formoe (born 1949 in Fredrikstad) singer/songwriter, actor, playwright and author
 Jørn Christensen (born 1959) artist, actor and record producer
 Dennis Storhøi (born 1960 in Fredrikstad) actor
 Petronella Barker (born 1965) British-born Norwegian actress, grew up in Fredrikstad
 Harald Zwart (born 1965) Dutch-Norwegian film director, grew up in Fredrikstad
 Andy LaPlegua (born 1975 in Fredrikstad) singer / songwriter, founded Combichrist, Icon of Coil and Panzer AG

Sport 

 Charles Hoff (1902 in Fredrikstad – 1985) athlete, coach, and sports journalist
 Arne Pedersen (1931 in Fredrikstad – 2013) footballer with Fredrikstad FK, with 231 club caps and 40 for Norway
 Roar Johansen (1935 in Fredrikstad – 2015) footballer and manager with Fredrikstad FK, with 190 club caps and 61 for Norway
 Egil "Drillo" Olsen (born 1942 in Fredrikstad) manager of Norway national football team
 Per Egil Ahlsen (born 1958 in Fredrikstad) footballer with 350 club caps and 54 for Norway
 Jørn Andersen (born 1963 in Fredrikstad) football manager with 454 club caps, 27 for Norway
 Erik Lund (born 1979 in Fredrikstad) former rugby union footballer
 Kari Mette Johansen (born 1979 in Fredrikstad) team handballer, twice Olympic team champion
 Isabell Herlovsen (born 1988) footballer with 133 caps with Norway women; lives in Fredrikstad
 Tarik Elyounoussi (born 1988) footballer, played for Fredrikstad FK, 60 caps with Norway
 Oliver Solberg (born 2001 in Frederikstad) Swedish-Norwegian rally driver

International relations

Twin towns – sister cities
The following cities are twinned with Fredrikstad:

See also
Norsk Teknisk Porselen

References

Footnotes

Sources

 Aschehougs Konversasjonsleksikon, Volume 7. Oslo: H. Aschehoug & Co, 1969. .

External links

 Bratt Family from Fredrikstad

 
Municipalities of Østfold
Municipalities of Viken (county)
Cities and towns in Norway
Populated coastal places in Norway
Populated places on the Glomma River
Port cities and towns in Norway
Populated places established in 1567
1567 establishments in Norway